Mitrit  is a mixed Shia Muslim and Maronite village in the Koura District, Lebanon.

References

External links
 Metrit, Localiban

Populated places in the North Governorate
Koura District
Maronite Christian communities in Lebanon